This is a list of stoves. A stove is an enclosed space in which fuel is burned to provide heating, either to heat the space in which the stove is situated, or to heat the stove itself and items placed on it. Stoves are generally used for cooking and heating purposes.

Stoves

 Aprovecho – Aprovecho Research Center has worked on designs for cook stoves, primarily for use in developing countries. They are best known for the Rocket stove, developed by their technical director Dr. Larry Winiarski.
 Bachelor griller – a countertop kitchen appliance with which a single person can grill, bake, boil or roast small portions of food
 Bamboo stove – an historical stove made in China in the late 14th century, it included bamboo to form the frame of the stove. The sides were cemented with clay and the inside walls and the ring on top were iron. It was about a foot tall.
 Beverage-can stove – a homemade, ultralight portable stove. The simple design is usually made entirely from aluminium cans and burns alcohol.
 BioLite
 Chambers stove – a generic name for several different kitchen cooking appliances sold under the Chambers brand name from 1912 to approximately 1988. Their ranges and stand-alone ovens were known for their patented insulation methods, which enabled them to cook on retained heat with the fuel turned off.
 Clean-burning stove – a stove with reduced toxic emissions. The term commonly refers to wood-burning stoves for domestic heating, although it is also applied to cooking stoves.
 Cocklestove or ceramic stove or tile stove
 Community Cooker
 Cook stove – heated by burning wood, charcoal, animal dung or crop residue. Cook stoves are commonly used for cooking and heating food in developing countries.
 EcoZoom
 Electric stove
 Foot stove
 Franklin stove – wood-burning stove designed by Benjamin Franklin, and improved and made practical by David Rittenhouse
 Gas stove – uses syngas, natural gas, propane, butane, liquefied petroleum gas or other flammable gas as a fuel source.
 Hibachi
 Hoàng Cầm stove – a stove intake and chimney system which diffused and dissipated smoke from cooking which prevented aerial detection of smoke by American military planes.
 Hobo stove – a style of improvised heat-producing and cooking device used in survival situations, by backpackers, hobos, tramps and homeless people.
 Hot plate
 Jetboil
 Kitchen stove – also referred to as a range, a kitchen appliance designed for the purpose of cooking food. Kitchen stoves rely on the application of direct heat for the cooking process and may also contain an oven, used for baking.
 Lò trấu – a type of versatile fuel burning cook stove used in Vietnam since the 1950s
 Masonry heater or masonry stove
 Multi-fuel stove
 Portable stove
 Potbelly stove
 Primus stove
 Range
 Red Cross stove – a kitchen or parlor stove used for cooking and heating mainly North American homes of the late 19th and early 20th-century.
 Rocket stove
 Rocket mass heater
 Rotimatic
 Shichirin – a lightweight, compact, and easy-to-move cooking stove
 Sigri (stove)
 Solar cooker
 Tea stove
 Tommy cooker – a compact, portable, solidified alcohol fuelled stove issued to British troops (Tommies) in World War I. It was notoriously ineffective; one soldier complained that it took two hours to boil half a pint of water.
 Turkey fryer
 Wood-burning stove – a heating appliance capable of burning wood fuel and wood-derived biomass fuel, such as wood pellets. Generally the appliance consists of a solid metal (usually cast iron or steel) closed fire chamber, a fire brick base and an adjustable air control.

See also

 Campingaz
 Cooker
 Grilling
 Barbecue
 Flattop grill
 Gas appliance
 Griddle
 History of the portable gas stove
 Kelly Kettle
 List of cooking appliances
 List of cooking techniques
 List of home appliances
 List of ovens
 Outdoor cooking

References

Stoves
Technology-related lists